Fairlands is the largest settlement (neighbourhood) of Worplesdon, a village with a civil parish council in the Borough of Guildford, Surrey, England.

Amenities
Fairlands has a parade of eight shops, a post office, a doctor's surgery, primary school, recreation ground and community centre.  The latter is used for resident's association meetings, meetings of other groups of cross-sections of the community, and private hire events.

Directly north of Fairlands is the Equestrian Centre of Merrist Wood College, which specialises in horticulture, landscaping, garden design, animal care, countryside, golf, sports turf, floristry, arboriculture and equine studies - it encompasses  of land.

Residents Association
The Fairlands, Liddington Hall and Gravetts Lane Community Association (FLGCA) is formed of residents of Fairlands and the surrounding residential areas. The FLGCA administer the community centre, form an umbrella organisation for various groups specific to the neighbourhoods, and more generally act for the benefit of residents. A free monthly magazine is delivered to every house within its scope.

Youth outreach
The Normandy Youth Center serves the area by sponsoring community-based programs targeting youth in the area (especially marginal groups and minorities) for the purpose of increasing exposure to educational opportunities and building a stronger community.

History
The small settlement developed in the 1930s from farms and heath/woodland on the inside bend of the Aldershot Road by developing a few roads of semi-detached houses and bungalows. Fairlands' main building period was around 1960 when many more roads were built. - its shops, community centre, doctor's surgery and school were built in the 1960s. The wholly green-buffered settlement is not bisected by any main roads and continues to reject street lighting, which adds strength to a suggestion the character of the settlement is semi-rural to rural.  Today 12 residential roads and closes form a clustered, garden-use dominated hamlet.

Transport

Road
The A323 Aldershot road adjoins Fairlands and provides an almost straight route from the community to Guildford, merging with the A322 road from Bagshot shortly before the A3's Wooden Bridge interchange.

Rail

Religion

Church of England
Financially supporting the church as its patron is Eton College.

Roman Catholic Church
Along Aldershot Road, before intersecting any other routes is the Church of St Mary, Rydes Hill with regular worship.

References

External links

www.fairlands.org.uk, the FLGCA website

Hamlets in Surrey
Borough of Guildford